Phtheirospermum is a monotypic genus of flowering plants belonging to the family Orobanchaceae. The only species is Phtheirospermum japonicum.

Its native range is Russian Far East to Korea.

References

Orobanchaceae
Orobanchaceae genera
Monotypic Lamiales genera